Marriotts School is a secondary school in Stevenage, Hertfordshire, England. The school was rebuilt along with Lonsdale School (for special needs children) after a grant from the government/council.

Marriotts is situated on a site overlooking the Fairlands Valley. The school playing fields run along the east side of the Fairland Lakes, which offer a range of water-sport activities.

External links 
 Marriotts School
 Marriotts Gymnastics Club

Schools in Stevenage
Secondary schools in Hertfordshire
Educational institutions established in 1995
1995 establishments in England
Community schools in Hertfordshire